Mihrdat III (Latinized as Mithridates), of the Chosroid Dynasty, was the king of Iberia (Kartli, eastern Georgia) from c. 365 to 380 (diarch 370–378).

Mihrdat succeeded his father, Varaz-Bakur known as Aspacures to the contemporaneous historian Ammianus Marcellinus and installed by Shapur II, the Sassanid king of Iran on the place of his nephew Sauromaces. Mihrdat is unknown to Ammianus who continues to refer to him as Aspacures (Amm. 27.12; 30.2).

Around 370, the Iranian intervention in Iberia drew a Roman response, and Ammianus reports an expedition sent by Emperor Valens to restore Sauromaces to the throne of Iberia. When the Roman legions reached the river Cyrus, their commander Terentius and Sauromaces forged a deal with Aspacures to divide the kingdom in two along the river. Aspacures indicated that he had considered defecting to Rome, but feared for the life of his son Vitra, who was by then a hostage at the Sassanid court. He was permitted to retain the control of northeastern Iberia, while Sauromaces was established in southwest. This situation is reflected in Leonti Mroveli’s story of defection of the people of Klarjeti (in Iberia’s southwest) to the Romans.

After the Roman defeat at Adrianople, Sauromaces was probably expelled in 378 and Aspacures presumably regained the whole kingdom.

References

Chosroid kings of Iberia
4th-century monarchs in Asia
Georgians from the Sasanian Empire